Robert Burke (born 1984) is an American screenwriter, producer and director. He founded the independent film production company Jumpshot Films in 1996. Burke is a graduate of the University of Washington, and a former actor.

Production filmography
Stewart Stern Unwritten (2020) (feature documentary) (filming) – director, producer
The Scheme of Things (2019) (feature film) (post-production) – writer, director, producer
Max Rules (2005) (feature film) – writer, director, producer
Smigs (2001) (short film) – writer, director, producer
Children of Afghanistan (2001) (short documentary) – producer
Smigs (2001) (short film) – writer, director, producer
Photo Finish (2000) (short film) – writer, director, executive producer
Naughty Pooch (1998) (short film) – writer, director, producer

References

External links
 
 Jumpshot Films official site

American film directors
American film producers
Place of birth missing (living people)
Date of birth missing (living people)
American male screenwriters
1984 births
University of Washington alumni
Living people